First Album Live is a live version of the self-titled first album by They Might Be Giants. The album was released in July 2014 in MP3 format at no charge on NoiseTrade All the songs were recorded during the band's 2013 tour.

Track listing
 “Everything Wrong Is Right Again” - 2:18
 “Put Your Hand Inside the Puppet Head”' - 2:17
 ”Number Three” - 1:32
 ”Don’t Let’s Start” - 2:27
 “Hide Away Folk Family” - 3:27
 “Thirty Two Footsteps” - 1:36
 “Toddler Hiway” - 6:57
 “Rabid Child” - 2:52
 “Nothing’s Gonna Change My Clothes” - 2:07
 “(She Was a) Hotel Detective” - 2:09
 “She’s an Angel” - 2:27
 “Youth Culture Killed My Dog” - 2:30
 “Boat of Car” - 1:27
 “Absolutely Bill’s Mood” - 2:52
 “Chess Piece Face” - 1:13
 “I Hope That I Get Old Before I Die” - 1:40
 “Alienation’s for the Rich” - 2:21
 “The Day” - 1:44
 “Rhythm Section Want Ad” - 2:50

References

External links
https://noisetrade.com/theymightbegiants/first-album-live

2014 live albums
They Might Be Giants live albums
Idlewild Recordings live albums